Balochistan earthquake may refer to:

2008 Ziarat earthquakes
2013 Balochistan earthquakes
2021 Balochistan earthquake